Sint Philipsland may refer to:

 Sint Philipsland (island), a former island in the Dutch province of Zeeland
 Sint Philipsland (village), a village in the Dutch municipality of Tholen